Tabogon, officially the Municipality of Tabogon,  is a 3rd class municipality in the province of Cebu, Philippines. According to the 2020 census, it has a population of 41,432 people.

Tabogon is bordered on the north by the city of Bogo, to the west by the town of San Remigio, on the east by the Camotes Sea, and on the south by the town of Borbon.

Tabogon may come from the archaic Visayan word tabog, which means "busy", in reference to the bustling farm fields that dotted this place during the olden times; hence tabogon would mean a busy place of work.

Geography

Barangays
Tabogon comprises 25 barangays:

Climate

Demographics

Economy

References

External links

 [ Philippine Standard Geographic Code]

Municipalities of Cebu